Rekha Rana is a Bollywood actress, theater artist, winner of Miss Delhi, Photogenic Face and Beautiful Smile titleholder in 2007. She is the brand ambassador for South African NGO called 'Star NGO' and 'Save Our Women' Campaign. Her first movie Ab Hoga Dharna Unlimited which is themed on Anna Hazare's Dharna released on 13 April 2012.

About 
Rekha Rana is an International award winning Actress, Entrepreneur and Philanthropist. She has received over 47 International Awards for Best Actress all over India and abroad.

Her film "Tara The Journey of Love & Passion" was submitted to the 87th Academy Awards for Best Foreign Language Film. The movie has received over 150 International Awards in 110 International Film Festivals Worldwide.

Rekha Rana is an alumna of New York Film Academy Los Angeles, CA., and worked in theatre with Dinesh Thakur’s Ank Theatre Group. She has completed over 200 shows internationally, of the famous plays 'Jis Lahore Nahin Dekhya' and "Hai Mera Dil". Her upcoming movie is ‘Yahan Ameena Bikti Hai’ which is directed and produced by Kumar Raj.

Rekha Rana's passion for humanitarian projects, including education in India, led her to be the World Ambassador for ‘Heart for India Foundation’ founded by Princess Francoise Sturdza, and also supporting and working with UNICEF.

Early life 
Rekha Rana was born in New Delhi, India. She spent her school life in High School Green Field, New Delhi. She participated in cultural activities including dancing, swimming and drama in her school. She joined Barry John Acting School after completed her degree in Delhi College of Arts and Commerce to enhance her passion towards drama.

Career beginnings
She  won Best Actress Award for her performance in the short film Take Care at Rangs Singapore film festival, 2010. She had been interested in theatre and had participated in many plays as the leading lady including Dinesh Thakur's Jis Lahore Nahi Dekhiya Oh Jameya Nahi. She was signed with the two films produced by  Crescendo Productions in lead roles. It is said that she is signed in the Hindi and Tamil versions of I hate Valentine's Day film being directed by Hemant Nilim das. As she is interested in humanitarian work, she has joined women's helmet promotion, started on 8 March 2010 at International Women's Day to make awareness among women wearing helmets. Rekha Rana performed more than 150 stage shows all over India and abroad with the Ank Theatre Group.

Filmography

Awards

Cameroons International Film Festival - 2016 
Best Actress Award - Rekha Rana

Received Best Actress Award from Cameroons International Film Festival on 2016

5th Jaipur International Film Festival - 2013 
Best Debut Actress Award - REKHA RANA

Award received from Jaipur Internation Film Festival on 2013 for the Awards winning Super Hit Movie "TARA"

Nasik International Film Festival - 2013 
Best Actress Debut Awards

Award received from Nasik International Film Festival on 2013 for the Awards winning Super Hit Movie "TARA"

Virginia Asian International Film Festival, USA - 2013 
Best Actress Award - REKHA RANA

Virginia Asian International Film Festival held at USA on 2013, Rekha Rana received the Best Actress Award.

Lions Club International Gold Awards - 2014 
Best Actress Debut Awards

Rekha Rana received yet another Best Actress Award from Lions Club International Gold Awards on 2014

Lions Club Giants Group Of Juhu - 2013 
Appreciation Award - REKHA RANA

Award received from Lions Club Giants Group of Juhu on 201 for the Awards winning Super Hit Movie "TARA"

Braintree International Film Festival USA - 2013 
Best Actress Awards - Rekha Rana

Rekha Rana received yet another Best Actress Award from Braintree International Film Festival USA on 2013

International Film Festival Of Kanyakumari - 2013 
Best Actress Award - REKHA RANA

Award received from International Film Festival of Kanyakumari on 2013 for the Awards winning Super Hit Movie "TARA"

2nd Darbhanga International Film Festival - 2014 
Best Actress Award

Rekha Rana received yet another Best Actress Award from 2nd Darbhanga International Film Festival on 2014

Ashtavinayak Trust - 2013 
Best Actress Award - REKHA RANA

Award Received for Best Actress in Socio-related film for the Awards winning Super Hit Movie "TARA"

Shakshiyat Magazine At Jaipur - 2014 
Shakshiyat Award

Rekha Rana received Shakshiyat Award from Shakshiyat Magazine at Jaipur on 2014.

Chennai Women’s International Film Festival - 2014 
Best Actress Award - REKHA RANA

Award Received for Best Actress from Chennai Women’s International Film Festival

KAF Business Entertainment Global Award - 2014 
Best Actress Award - 2014

Rekha Rana received yet another Best Actress Award from KAF Business Entertainment Global Award on 2014.

Paraj Mumbai Short Film Festival - 2014 
Best Actress Award - REKHA RANA

Rekha Rana received yet another Best Actress Award from Paraj Mumbai Short Film Festival on 2014

Lions Club Friends Circle - 2015 
Appreciation Award - 2014

Rekha Rana received another Appreciation Award for film Tara at Lions Club Friends Circle on 2015

Socio-Related Film International Women’s Day - 2014 
Best Actress Award - Rekha Rana

Award received from a Socio-related Film International Women’s Day on 2014

International Film & Entertainment Festival Australia (IFEFA) - 2014 
Best Actress Award - Rekha Rana

Rekha Rana received yet another Best Actress Award from IFEFA on 2014

References

External links

Living people
Actresses in Hindi cinema
Actresses in Telugu cinema
Female models from Delhi
Indian film actresses
21st-century Indian actresses
Year of birth missing (living people)
Actresses from New Delhi